"Non me lo so spiegare" (English: "I Can't Explain") is a song written and recorded by Italian singer Tiziano Ferro. It was released as the third single from his second studio album, 111. The music video for the song was directed by Paolo Monico. The song was also translated in Spanish and recorded by Tiziano Ferro himself for the Hispanic version of the album, under the title "No me lo puedo explicar".

In 2006, Ferro re-recorded the song as a duet with Italian singer Laura Pausini. This version of the song was included in Pausini's 2006 album Io canto and it was released as a single in March 2007.

Background and composition
During an interview released in November 2003, Ferro revealed that the song was initially written for his debut album, Rosso relativo, but it was not featured on the record for various reasons: "We didn't know if the album would have sold well, therefore we kept the song for the Sanremo Music Festival. If things would have gone bad, 'Non me lo so spiegare' would have been my entry for Sanremo".

The song is a pop ballad, described by Musica e dischi'''s Antonio Orlando as a "neoclassic Italian song". Orlando also compared "Non me lo so spiegare" to Claudio Baglioni's previous songs.

Live performances
Tiziano Ferro performed the song in July 2004 during the Italian itinerant TV show Festivalbar, broadcast by Italia 1. He also performed the song in March 2007, when he participated as a guest artist in the semifinal of the 57th Sanremo Music Festival. A live version of the song was also included in Ferro's live video album Alla mia età live in Roma, released on 20 November 2009 and recorded in June 2009 during his concert at the Stadio Olimpico in Rome.

Track listing
Digital download – "Non me lo so spiegare" (2004)
 "Non me lo so spiegare" – 4:00
CD single – "No me lo puedo explicar" (2004)
 "No me lo puedo explicar" – 4:00

Personnel

Music credits
 Michele Canova – arrangements, rhythmic programming, keyboards
 Leonardo Di Angilla – percussions
 Tiziano Ferro – vocals, composer
 Andrea Fontana – drums
 Cristian Rigano – Rhodes piano, acoustic piano, keyboards
 Pino Saracini – bass
 Davide Tagliapietra – guitars

Production credits
 Michele Canova – producer, engineer, mixing
 Sandro Franchin – additional engineer
 Mara Maionchi – producer
 Alberto Salerno – producer

Charts

Certifications

Laura Pausini cover

Laura Pausini recorded the song as a duet with Tiziano Ferro for her 2006's album Io canto. This version of the song was released on 23 March 2007 as the album's third single. The Spanish adaptation of the song, also featuring Ferro on vocals, was also included in the Hispanic version of the album, Yo canto.

Background
During an interview, Pausini revealed that, before starting the recording sessions for her album Io canto, entirely composed of covers of popular songs by Italian male artists, she had decided not to record duets with Italian singers. "I was afraid to offend the artists I didn't call, I wanted to record duets with foreign artists only, so that they could give something new to these popular songs. But when I started recording Tiziano's song, there was something missing, therefore I thought it was the right chance to put our voices together".

Live performances
Laura Pausini and Tiziano Ferro performed the song live for the first time on 30 January 2007 in Milan, during a venue of Tiziano Ferro's Nessuno è solo tour. "Non me lo so spiegare" was also performed as a duet with Ferro during Pausini's only 2007 concert, held at the San Siro Stadium on 2 July 2007. The concert was later released as a DVD under the title San Siro 2007, and it was broadcast by Italia 1 on 11 December 2007.

In December 2009, Pausini and Ferro performed together the song during an episode of Rai 2's TV programme Due'', entirely dedicated to them.

Music video
The music video for the song, directed by Gaetano Morbioli, was filmed at the Dino Studios in Rome. The ambientation of the video recreates a desert, with an old petrol pump and roadsigns pointing to the Midwest. Pausini and Ferro are shown on opposite sides of a parked car, representing two aching souls who cannot look at each other.

Personnel

Music credits
 Riccardo Capanni – concert master
 Max Costa – programming, additional keyboards
 Cesare Chiodo – bass
 Emiliano Fantuzzi – acoustic guitar, electric guitar
 Tiziano Ferro – vocals, composer
 Gabriele Fersini – electric guitar
 Alfredo Golino – drums
 Filippo Martelli – string arrangement, string conductor
 Omersea Orchestra – strings
 Dado Parisini – keyboards, string arrangement
 Laura Pausini – vocals

Production credits
 Max Costa – pre-producer, mixing
 Emiliano Fantuzzi – pre-producer
 Dado Parisini – producer
 Jon Jacobs – engineer, mixing
 Francesco Luzzi – engineer
 Gabriele Gigli – assistant
 Matteo Bolzoni – assistant
 Dado Parisini – mixing

Charts

References

2004 singles
2007 singles
Italian-language songs
Spanish-language songs
Tiziano Ferro songs
Laura Pausini songs
Male–female vocal duets
Pop ballads
Songs written by Tiziano Ferro
2003 songs
EMI Records singles
Song recordings produced by Michele Canova